Plesiomorpha is a monotypic moth genus in the family Geometridae described by Warren in 1898.

Species
Plesiomorpha punctilinearia (Leech, 1891)
Plesiomorpha vulpecula Warren, 1898
Plesiomorpha flaviceps Butler, 1881

References

Baptini